Edward Embleton (born 1916) was an English professional footballer who played as an inside forward.

Career
Born in South Moor, Embleton played for Norwich City, Bradford City, Hartlepools United, Gateshead and Doncaster Rovers.

For Bradford City he made three appearances in the Football League, scoring one goal.

Sources

References

1916 births
Year of death missing
English footballers
Norwich City F.C. players
Bradford City A.F.C. players
Hartlepool United F.C. players
English Football League players
Association football inside forwards
Gateshead F.C. players
Doncaster Rovers F.C. players
People from South Moor
Footballers from County Durham